Rawyards railway station served the area of Rawyards, North Lanarkshire, Scotland, from 1845 to 1930 on the Ballochney Railway.

History
The station was opened in March 1845 by the Ballochney Railway. Opposite the platform was the western signal box, which was known as 'Rawyards West', and to the northeast was the Eastern signal box. Both of them opened on 1888. The eastern signal box controlled access to the goods yard and Rawyards Wagon Works. It was also known as Clarkston Junction in the 1867 edition of the handbook of stations. The station closed on 1 May 1930.

References

Disused railway stations in North Lanarkshire
Railway stations in Great Britain opened in 1845
Railway stations in Great Britain closed in 1930
1845 establishments in Scotland
1930 disestablishments in Scotland